The 2019 Firestone Grand Prix of St. Petersburg was the 1st round of the 2019 IndyCar season. The race was held on March 10, 2019, in St. Petersburg, Florida. Will Power qualified on pole position, while Josef Newgarden took victory in the 110-lap race.

Results

Qualifying

Race 

Notes:
 Points include 1 point for leading at least 1 lap during a race, an additional 2 points for leading the most race laps, and 1 point for Pole Position.

Championship standings after the race 

Drivers' Championship standings

Manufacturer standings

 Note: Only the top five positions are included.

References 

Grand Prix of St. Petersburg
21st century in St. Petersburg, Florida
Firestone Grand Prix of St. Petersburg
Firestone Grand Prix of St. Petersburg
Firestone Grand Prix of St. Petersburg